The players' draft for the 2022–23 Bangladesh Premier League took place on 23 November 2022 at Le Meridian Hotel in Dhaka.

Players draft rules
 Each team should have at least 12 players, ten being local players and two being foreign players.
 Each team can sign only one local player through direct signing and at least nine local players are to be picked from the draft
 There is no maximum limit of signing foreign players both directly and through the draft.

Salary cap

Local players
216 local players were listed into seven categories with the following salary cap:-

 Category A – 
 Category B – 
 Category C – 
 Category D – 
 Category E – 
 Category F – 
 Category G –

Foreign players

 Category A – 80,000
 Category B – 60,000
 Category C – 40,000
 Category D – 30,000
 Category E – 20,000

Players list
This is the list of local players listed in the draft.

A Category 
Mushfiqur Rahim, Mahmudullah Riyad, Liton Kumar Das.

B Category
Najmul Hossain Shanto, Mohammad Saifuddin, Mosaddek Hossain Saikat, Mehidy Hasan Miraz, Imrul Kayes, Mehidy Hasan, Nasum Ahmed.

C Category
Rubel Hossain, Yasir Ali Chowdhury, Enamul Haque Bijay, Mominul Haque, Naeem Sheikh, Mohammad Shoriful Islam, Soumya Sarkar, Kamrul Islam Rabbi, Taijul Islam, Mohammad Mithun, Mohammad Saif Hassan, Shubhagat Home Chowdhury, Mohammad Mukidul Islam Mochad, Ebadat Hossain, Sabbir Rahman, Munim Shahriar, Mehdi Hasan Rana, Nahidul Islam, Irfan Shukur, Fazle Mahmud Rabbi, Mohammad Shamim Hasan, Roni Talukder, Syed Khaled Ahmed, Naeem Hasan, Zakir Ali Anik.

D Category 
Sanjamul Islam, Mohammad Zakir Hasan, Tanveer Islam, Parvez Hossain Imon, Rezaur Rahman, Tanjid Hasan Tamim, Mahmudul Hasan Joy, Nasir Hossain, Junaid Siddiqui, Akbar Ali, Marshal Ayyub, Nadif Chowdhury, Enamul Haque Jr., Muktar Ali, Alauddin Babu, Naeem Islam, Shafiqul Islam, Nabeel Samad, Alok Kapali, Abu Zayed Chowdhury Rahi, Sohag Gazi, Mohammad Al Amin Hossain (Senior), Shamsur Rahman, Arafat Sani, Abu Haider Roni, Touhid Hriday, Mohammad Saikat Ali, Ziaur Rahman, Ariful Haque, Mohammad Shafiul Islam, Zahirul Islam (wicketkeeper), Farhad Reza, Mritunjoy Chowdhury, Mahidul Angkan, Nazmul Islam Apu.

E Category
Mohammad Al Amin Hossain (Junior), Sanjit Saha, Mohammad Tanbir Haider Khan, Mohammad Ashraful, Mahmudul Hasan Limon, Mohammad Abdul Majeed, Mizanur Rahman, Monir Hossain Khan, Imranuzzaman, Mohammad Ilyas, Suhrawardy Shuvo, Mehdi Maruf, Rakibul Hassan Sr., Saqline Sajib, Mohr Sheikh Antar, Dhiman Ghosh, Suman Khan, Rahatul Ferdous Javed, Rabiul Haque, Kazi Anik, Salman Hossain, Taibur Rahman Parvez, Maishukur Rahman Rial, Anisul Islam Imon, Amit Hasan, Pritam Kumar, Salahuddin Shakeel, Ruel Mia,Noman Chowdhury, Pinak Ghosh, Sadman Islam, Ashikuzzaman, Noor Hossain Saddam, Mohammad Sharifullah, Aminul Islam Biblab, Mohammad Hasan Murad, Abdul Halim, Farhad Hossain, Asif Hasan, Jabid Hossain, Abu Sayem, Zubair Hossain Likhan, Mohammad Naeem Islam (Jr.), Sazzadul Haque Ripon, Enamul Haque Jr (pace bowler), Masum Khan Tutul, Zahid Javed, Shamsul Islam, Fardin Hossain Ani, Rabiul Islam Ravi, Rubel Mia, Asaduzzaman Piyal, Sajjad Hossain Sabbir, Mushfiq Hasan, Tauhid Tarek Khan, Sabbir Hossain, Ripon Mandal, Mofizul Islam Robin.Mohiuddin Tarek, Manik Khan, Raihan Uddin, Alis Al Islam, Sayem Alam, Zahiduzzaman Khan, Moin Khan, Sanaur Rahman, Jasimuddin, AKS Swadhin, Jawad, Mohammad Ashikuzzaman, Nahid Rana, Mushfiq Hasan, Rakibul Hasan Jr., Nazmul Saqib.

F Category
Nihad-uz-Zaman, Mohaiminul Khan Chowdhury, Abhishek Mitra, Johnny Talukder, Minhajul Abedin Afridi, Azmir Ahmed, Islamul Ahsan Abir, Aich Mollah, Taufiq Khan Tushar, Rayan Rafsan Rahman, Nahid Rana, Mamun Hossain, Mainul Islam, Tipu Sultan, Mohammad Nuruzzaman, Mainul Sohail, Abdur Rashid, Abdullah Al Mamun, Yasin Arafat Mishu.Iftekhar Sajjad Roni, Mohammad Hasanuzzaman, Shahadat Hossain Dipu, Ajmir Ahmed, Shaheen Alam, Nazmul Hossain Milan, Imtiaz Hossain Tanna, Mohammad Tasamul Haque Rubel, Amit Majumdar, Delwar Hossain, Shahbaz Chauhan, Shahadat Hossain Rajib, Shahnaz Ahmed, Ahmed Sadiqur Rahman, Shehnaz Ahmed, Rafsan Al Mahmud, Mohammad Azim, Mohammad Shakeel Ahmed, Rakin Ahmed, Ali Ahmed Manik, Ifran Hussain.

G Category 
Shubashis Roy, Asadullah Al Ghalib, Russell Al Mamun, Habibur Rahman Johnny, Mohammad Asif, Imran Ali, Hussain Ali, Biswajit Halder, Sujan Howlader, Shahanur Rahman, Jai Raj Sheikh, Shafiul Hayat Hriday, Mehrab Hossain Josi, Tauhidul Islam Russell, Zainul Islam, Mahmudul Haque Sentu, Nabin Islam, Golam Kabir Sohail, Kazi Kamrul Islam, Shakeel Hossain, Nahid Hasan, Shakhawat Hossain, Ahmed Abidul Haque, Mohammad Rakib, Mohammad Roni Hossain, Mahmudul Islam Anik, Alamin Raju, Samsul Islam Anil, Abdur Rahman, Zakirul Islam, Habibur Rahman Sohan.

Drafted players
This is the list of drafted players in the players draft.

Fortune Barishal
Mahmudullah Riyad
Mehidy Hasan Miraz
Ebdaot Hossain
Anamul Haque Bijoy
Kamrul Islam Rabbi
Fazle Rabbi
Haider Ali
Chaturanga De Silva
Khaled Ahmed
Saif Hassan
Qazi Onik
Sunjamul Islam
Salman Hossain.

Chattogram Challengers
Mrittunjoy Chowdhury
Shuvagata Hom
Mehedi Hasan Rana
Irfan Sukkur
Mehedi Maruf
Ziaur Rahman
Max O Dowd
Unmukt Chand
Taijul Islam
Abu Jayed Rahi
Farhad Reza
Towfiq Khan Tushar

Comilla Victorians
Litton Das
Imrul Kayes
Mosaddek Hossain
Tanvir Islam
Ashiqur Zaman
Jaker Ali
Sean Williams
Chadwick Walton
Shykat Ali
Mahidul Islam Ankon
Abu Hider Rony
Nayeem Hasan
Mukidul Islam Mugdho.

Dhaka Dominators
Soumya Sarkar
Mohammad Mithun
Nasir Hossain
Shan Masood
Ahmed Shahzad
Alok Kapali
Monir Hossain Khan
Ariful Haque
Mukhtar Ali
Mizanur Rahman
Delwar Hossain
Usman Ghani
Salman Irshad
Al Amin Hossain
Arafat Sunny
Shoriful Islam.

Sylhet Strikers
Najmul Hossain Shanto
Zakir Hasan
Mushfiqur Rahim
Towhid Hridoy
Tom Moores
Gulbadin Naib
Akbar Ali
Mohammad Sharifullah
Tanjim Sakib
Taibur Rahman
Rubel Hossain
Nabil Samad
Najmul Islam Opu
Rejaur Rahman Raja.

Rangpur Riders
Naim Sheikh
Parvez Hossain Emon
Rony Talukder
Rakibul Hasan Jnr
Shamim Hossain Patwary
Azmatullah Omarzai
Aaron Jones
Alauddin Babu
Mahedi Hasan
Ripon Mondal
Hasan Mahmud

Khulna Tigers
Mohammad Saifuddin
Yasir Ali Rabbi
Nasum Ahmed
Nahidul Islam
Munim Shahriar
Sabbir Rahman
Dasun Shanaka
Shofiqul Islam
Pritom Kumar
Habibur Rahman Sohan
Mahmudul Hasan Joy
Paul Van Meekeren

Direct Signing
This is the list of direct signings of every team.

References

Bangladesh Premier League seasons